Chinnathirai is a Tamil Thriller Crime soap opera that airs on Shakthi TV. This serial showcases one story for one month. It airs Saturday and Sunday at 8:30pm.

Series
 Jeevan
 Kadhal.com
 Ithu Enna Mayam
 Thundil Meen
 Min mini Kadhal
 Thiyagam
 Velichcham
 Sathurangam
 Pavithra
 Uyire
 Hello
 Dhegam Sandhegam
 Rendu
 Nizhal
 Nee Than Pei

References

External links

Shakthi TV television series
Sri Lankan drama television series
2014 Tamil-language television series debuts
Tamil-language television shows